5 Andromedae is a single, yellow-white hued star in the northern constellation of Andromeda. Its designation comes from a catalogue of stars by English astronomer John Flamsteed, published in 1712. The star is faintly visible to the naked eye, having an apparent visual magnitude of 5.68. Based upon an annual parallax shift of 29.12 mas as seen from Earth, it is located 112 light years away. 5 Andromedae is moving closer to the Sun with a radial velocity of −2.6 km/s. It has a relatively high proper motion, advancing across the celestial sphere at the rate of 0.201 arc seconds per year.

This is an ordinary F-type main-sequence star with a stellar classification of F5 V. It is estimated to be 2.3 billion years old and is spinning with a projected rotational velocity of 9.7 km/s. The star has 1.39 times the mass of the Sun. It is radiating 5.6 times the Sun's luminosity from its photosphere at an effective temperature of about 6,605 K.

Within Andromeda it is the second of a northerly chain asterism – 7, 8, 11 are further south-westward, with 3 Andromedae in the other direction.

References

F-type main-sequence stars
High-proper-motion stars
Andromeda (constellation)
Andromedae, 05
Durchmusterung objects
218470
114210
8805